Andrew Tombes (29 June 1885 – 17 March 1976) was an American comedian and character actor.

Biography
The son of a grocer, originally from Ashtabula, Ohio, Tombes was educated at Phillips Exeter Academy. Early in his career, he worked as a vaudeville comic. By December 1914 he had appeared in the headlining act for the opening of the Kansas City Orpheum Theatre.

He successfully ascended to Broadway comedies beginning in 1917, in the revue Miss 1917, and appeared there consistently through the 1920s, for instance in Poor Little Ritz Girl in 1920, Tip-Toes in 1925, and the Ziegfeld Follies of 1922 and 1927.

Tombes' first film appearances were in 1933, as he was already approaching 50 years old.  He made a total of about 150 films for various studios.

Selected filmography

 The Bowery (1933) - Shill (uncredited)
 Broadway Through a Keyhole (1933) - Sidney - Columnist (uncredited)
 Moulin Rouge (1934) - McBride
 Doubting Thomas (1935) - Huxley Hossefrosse
 Here Comes Cookie (1935) - Botts
 Music Is Magic (1935) - Ben Pomeroy
 Thanks a Million (1935) - Mr. Grass
 King of Burlesque (1936) - Slattery
 It Had to Happen (1936) - Dooley
 Here Comes Trouble (1936) - Adams
 The Country Beyond (1936) - Sen. Rawlings
 Half Angel (1936) - Jury Foreman (uncredited)
 Ticket to Paradise (1936) - Nirney
 Hot Money (1936) - Willie
 Stage Struck (1936) - Burns Heywood
 The Devil Is a Sissy (1936) - Muldoon - a Policeman (uncredited)
 The Holy Terror (1937) - Commander J.J. Otis
 Time Out for Romance (1937) - James Blanchard
 Fair Warning (1937) - J.C. Farnham
 Turn Off the Moon (1937) - Dr. Wakefield
 Charlie Chan at the Olympics (1937) - Police Chief Scott
 Sing and Be Happy (1937) - Thomas Lane
 Riding on Air (1937) - Eddie Byrd
 Easy Living (1937) - E.J. Hulgar
 Meet the Boyfriend (1937) - J. Ardmore Potts
 Big City (1937) - Inspector Matthews
 45 Fathers (1937) - Judge
 Checkers (1937) - Tobias Somers
 Borrowing Trouble (1937) - Uncle George
 Everybody Sing (1938) - Smith - The Gary Society Man (uncredited)
 Sally, Irene and Mary (1938) - Judge Wyler
 Battle of Broadway (1938) - Judge Hutchins
 Romance on the Run (1938) - J.W. Ridgeway
 One Wild Night (1938) - Police Chief William Nolan
 A Desperate Adventure (1938) - Cosmo Carrington
 Vacation from Love (1938) - Judge Brandon
 Five of a Kind (1938) - Dr. Bruno
 Always in Trouble (1938) - J. C. Darlington
 Thanks for Everything (1938) - Mayor
 Boy Trouble (1939) - Mr. Svively
 What a Life (1939) - Professor Abernathy
 Too Busy to Work (1939) - Wilbur Wentworth
 Nick Carter, Master Detective (1939) - Robinson (uncredited)
 Balalaika (1939) - Wilbur Allison (uncredited)
 Money to Burn (1939) - Brown
 Wolf of New York (1940) - Sylvester Duncan
 Village Barn Dance (1940) - James Rutherford Sr.
 In Old Missouri (1940) - Attorney
 Captain Caution (1940) - Sad Eyes
 Third Finger, Left Hand (1940) - Mr. Kelland (uncredited)
 Melody and Moonlight (1940) - Promoter (uncredited)
 Charter Pilot (1940) - Brady
 The Wild Man of Borneo (1941) - 'Doc' Dunbar
 Meet the Chump (1941) - Revello
 A Girl, a Guy and a Gob (1941) - Bus Conductor (uncredited)
 Meet John Doe (1941) - Spencer
 Double Date (1941) - Judge Perkins
 Melody for Three (1941) - Mickey Delany
 Sis Hopkins (1941) - Mayor
 Caught in the Draft (1941) - Justice of the Peace (uncredited)
 Mountain Moonlight (1941) - Sen. Marvin
 Lady Scarface (1941) - Art Seidel - hotel detective
 World Premiere (1941) - Nixon
 A Dangerous Game (1941) - Silas Biggsby
 Last of the Duanes (1941) - Sheriff Frank Taylor
 Texas (1941) - Tennessee
 Down Mexico Way (1941) - Mayor Tubbs
 Louisiana Purchase (1941) - Dean Albert Manning
 Bedtime Story (1941) - Pierce
 Hellzapoppin' (1941) - Max Kane (uncredited)
 Don't Get Personal (1942) - James M. Snow
 Blondie Goes to College (1942) - J.J 'Snookie' Wadsworth
 Call Out the Marines (1942) - Mr. Woods (uncredited)
 A Close Call for Ellery Queen (1942) - Bates
 Obliging Young Lady (1942) - First Train Conductor
 Larceny, Inc. (1942) - Oscar Engelhart
 My Gal Sal (1942) - Corbin
 They All Kissed the Bride (1942) - Crane
 Between Us Girls (1942) - Doctor
 Road to Morocco (1942) - Oso Bucco (uncredited)
 Reveille with Beverly (1943) - Mr. Smith
 The Meanest Man in the World (1943) - Judge (uncredited)
 Hi'ya, Chum (1943) - Jerry MackIntosh, Cook
 It Ain't Hay (1943) - Big-Hearted Charlie
 A Stranger in Town (1943) - Roscoe Swade
 It's a Great Life (1943) - Insurance Agent (uncredited)
 Du Barry Was a Lady (1943) - Mr. McGowan (uncredited)
 Coney Island (1943) - Horace Carter (uncredited)
 Honeymoon Lodge (1943) - Judge Wilkins
 Hi Diddle Diddle (1943) - Mike
 Let's Face It (1943) - Judge Henry Clay Pigeon
 I Dood It (1943) - Mr. Spelvin
 Crazy House (1943) - Horace L. Gregory
 My Kingdom for a Cook (1943) - Abe Mason (uncredited)
 Swing Fever (1943) - Dr. Clyde L. Star
 Riding High (1943) - P.D. Smith (uncredited)
 The Mad Ghoul (1943) - Eagan
 His Butler's Sister (1943) - Brophy
 Phantom Lady (1944) - Bartender
 Week-End Pass (1944) - Constable
 Show Business (1944) - Judge (uncredited)
 Bathing Beauty (1944) - Justice of the Peace (uncredited)
 Kansas City Kitty (1944) - Judge (uncredited)
 Reckless Age (1944) - Mr. Cook
 The Merry Monahans (1944) - Osborne (uncredited)
 San Fernando Valley (1944) - Cyclone Kenyon
 The Singing Sheriff (1944) - Jonas
 Goin' to Town (1944) - Parker
 Murder in the Blue Room (1944) - Dr. Carroll
 Something for the Boys (1944) - Southern Colonel (uncredited)
 Lake Placid Serenade (1944) - Skating Club Head
 Can't Help Singing (1944) - Sad Sam
 Night Club Girl (1945) - Simmons
 Bring On the Girls (1945) - Dr. Spender
 G.I. Honeymoon (1945) - Reverend Horace
 Patrick the Great (1945) - Sam Bassett
 Rhapsody in Blue (1945) - Mr. Million
 You Came Along (1945) - Drunk
 Incendiary Blonde (1945) - Hadley (uncredited)
 Don't Fence Me In (1945) - Cartwright
 Frontier Gal (1945) - Judge Prescott
 Two Sisters from Boston (1946) - Recording Session Director (uncredited)
 Badman's Territory (1946) - Doc Grant
 Sing While You Dance (1946) - Gorman
 Beat the Band (1947) - 'Professor' Enrico Blanchetti / Mr. Dillingham
 The Devil Thumbs a Ride (1947) - Joe Brayden, Night Watchman
 The Fabulous Dorseys (1947) - De Witt (uncredited)
 Copacabana (1947) - Anatole Murphy (uncredited)
 Hoppy's Holiday (1947) - Mayor Patton
 Christmas Eve (1947) - Auctioneer
 Louisiana (1947)
 My Wild Irish Rose (1947) - Herman Baxter - Bartender (uncredited)
 Two Guys from Texas (1948) - The Texan
 Oh, You Beautiful Doll (1949) - Ted Held
 Joe Palooka in Humphrey Takes a Chance (1950) - Sheriff Grogan
 The Jackpot (1950) - Attorney Pritchett (uncredited)
 Watch the Birdie (1950) - Doctor (uncredited)
 A Wonderful Life (1951) – Harry Jenkins
 Belle Le Grand (1951) - Cartwright (uncredited)
 Oklahoma Annie (1952) - Mayor of Eureka
 I Dream of Jeanie (1952) - R.E. Howard
 How to Be Very, Very Popular (1955) - Police Sgt. Moon
 The Go-Getter (1956) - Mr. Symington (final film role)

References

External links

1885 births
1976 deaths
20th-century American male actors
20th-century American singers
20th-century American male singers
American male film actors
American male musical theatre actors
Male actors from Ohio
People from Ashtabula, Ohio
Phillips Exeter Academy alumni
Vaudeville performers